Beşyol may refer to:

 Beşyol, Besni, a village in Adıyaman Province, Turkey
 Beşyol, Eceabat, a village in Çanakkale Province, Turkey
 Beşyol, Küçükçekmece, a neighborhood of Küçükçekmece, Istanbul, Turkey